Mariyang-Geku (Vidhan Sabha constituency) is one of the 60 assembly constituencies of  Arunachal Pradesh a north east state of India. It is also part of Arunachal West Lok Sabha constituency.

Members of Legislative Assembly
 1990: Kabang Borang, Indian National Congress
 1995: Kabang Borang, Indian National Congress
 1999: Kabang Borang, Indian National Congress
 2004: J.K. Panggeng, Arunachal Congress
 2009: J.K. Panggeng, Indian National Congress
 2014: Olom Panyang, Bharatiya Janata Party

Election results

2019

See also
 Itanagar
 Upper Siang district
 List of constituencies of Arunachal Pradesh Legislative Assembly

References

Assembly constituencies of Arunachal Pradesh
Upper Siang district